Rugaaga is a town in Isingiro District in the Western Region of Uganda.

Location

The geographical coordinates of Rugaaga Town are 0°49'40.0"S, 31°01'23.0"E (Latitude:-0.827778; Longitude 31.023056).

Population
Rugaaga Town Council simultaneously serves as the headquarters of Rugaaga Sub-county, in Bukanga County in Isingiro District. In 2015, the Uganda Bureau of Statistics (UBOS), estimated the population of Rugaaga sub-county at 33,900. In 2020, UBOS estimated the mid-year population of the sub-county a 40,500 inhabitants, of whom 20,700 (51.1 percent) were female and 17,800 (48.9 percent) were male. UBOS calculated that the population in the sub-county grew at an average annual rate of 3.6 percent, between 2015 and 2020.

Points of interest
The following additional points of interest lie within the town or near its edges: (a) the offices of Rugaaga Town Council (b) Rugaaga Health Center IV, administered by Isingiro District Administration on behalf of the Uganda Ministry of Health.

The Isingiro–Ntantamuki–Rakai Road passes through the middle of Rugaaga in a general north to south direction.

Notable people
Gordon Babala Kasibante Wavamunno, a businessman, entrepreneur and philanthropist was born in Rugaaga in December 1943.

Mull Sebujja Katende, a Ugandan diplomat who serves as the Ambassador of Uganda to the United States, was born here in February 1957.

See also
 List of cities and towns in Uganda

References

External links
 Approximate Road Distance Between Rakai General Hospital And Rugaaga Health Centre IV Is Approximately 

Populated places in Uganda
Cities in the Great Rift Valley
Isingiro District
Western Region, Uganda